is a former Japanese football player.

Playing career
Kanzaki was born in Koka on June 21, 1982. After graduating from high school, he joined J2 League club Kawasaki Frontale in 2001. However he could only play 1 match in 2002 Emperor's Cup until 2004. In 2005, he moved to Regional Leagues club Banditonce Kobe (later Banditonce Kakogawa). He became a regular player and played many matches until 2008. In 2009, he moved to Regional Leagues club Kamatamare Sanuki. He played as regular player and Kamatamare was promoted to Japan Football League from 2011. However he could hardly play in the match in 2013. Although Kamatamare was promoted to J2 end of 2013 season, he retired end of 2013 season without playing J2.

Coaching career
After the retirement, Kanzaki started coaching career at Vissel Kobe in 2014.

Club statistics

References

External links
Vissel Kobe

1982 births
Living people
Association football people from Shiga Prefecture
Japanese footballers
J2 League players
Japan Football League players
Kawasaki Frontale players
Kamatamare Sanuki players
Association football defenders